Luis Bagnato (10 May 1924 – 10 December 1997) was an Argentine footballer. He played in one match for the Argentina national football team in 1955. He was also part of Argentina's squad for the 1955 South American Championship.

References

External links
 

1924 births
1997 deaths
Argentine footballers
Argentina international footballers
Place of birth missing
Association football defenders
Club Atlético Banfield footballers